High Sorcery is a collection of fantasy short stories by American writer Andre Norton. It was first published in paperback by Ace Books in March 1970, and was reprinted by the same publisher in 1971, 1973, and 1976; a second edition, reset but otherwise unchanged, was published in paperback by Ace in March 1979, and was reprinted in 1982 and 1984. All printings of the first edition bore cover art by artist Gray Morrow, which was replaced in all printings of the second edition with new art by Steve Hickman.

Summary
The book collects five novellas and short stories by Norton, including the "Witch World" story "Ully the Piper".

Contents
"Wizards' World" (from If, v, 17, no. 6, June 1967)
"Through the Needle's Eye" (original to this collection)
"By a Hair" (from Phantom Magazine, July 1958)
"Ully the Piper" (original to this collection)
"Toys of Tamisan" (from If, v. 19, nos. 4–5, April–May 1969)

Notes

1970 short story collections
Fantasy short story collections
Short story collections by Andre Norton
Ace Books books
High fantasy
High fantasy novels